Lemuel Adolphus Johnson (15 December 1941 – 12 March 2002), was a Sierra Leonean professor, poet, and writer who was based at the University of Michigan.

Early life 
Lemuel Adolphus Johnson was born on 15 December 1941 to Sierra Leone Creole parents in Nigeria. Johnson was raised with a strong awareness of his Creole heritage and this would emerge as a feature of his literary works, notably in The Sierra Leone Trilogy.

His grandfather, Reverend Canon S.S. Williams, was a vicar at the Church of the Holy Trinity, Freetown and part of Johnson's family had ancestral roots in Regent Village in the Colony of Sierra Leone.

Education
Johnson was educated at the Sierra Leone Grammar School and in 1960 he received the highest scores in all West Africa on the Cambridge University Higher School Certificate examinations. In 1965, Johnson graduated with a degree in Modern Languages from Oberlin College an M.A. in Spanish from the Pennsylvania State University in 1966. Johnson subsequently earned a Ph.D. in Comparative Literature from the University of Michigan in 1968.

Johnson was appointed as an assistant professor of English at the University of Michigan in 1966 and was eventually promoted to a full professorship. Between 1985 and 1991, Johnson was a Director of the Center for Afro American and African Studies at the University of Michigan.

Professor Johnson was appointed a Professor investigador at the Colegio de Mexico, Mexico City, and intermittently taught at Fourah Bay College at the University of Sierra Leone, on the Faculty of Literature at the Salzberg Seminar, and as a Visiting Distinguished Professor at Oberlin College.

Academic memberships and associations
Johnson was elected as the president of the African Literature Association and served in this role from 1977 to 1978. Johnson was also the Vice President of the Association of Caribbean Studies between 1983 and 1985, and he served on the Africa Committee of the Social Science Research Council between 1985 and 1990.

Literary works
Johnson published several literary works such as The Devil, the Gargoyle, & the Buffoon: The Negro as Metaphor in Western Literatures in 1970 and Shakespeare in Africa & Other Venues: Import and the Appropriation of Culture in 1998. He also published a translation of Rafael Alberti's play, 'Night & War in the Prado Museum' in 1969 into English from the Spanish.

John also published a Sierra Leone Trilogy in 1995, which consisted of three volumes of poetry entitled Highlife for Caliban, Hand on the Navel, and Carnival of the Old Coast.

Awards
Johnson received several awards at the University of Michigan, including the Steelcase Research Professorship at the Institute for the Humanities, the Faculty Recognition Award, a Recognition Award from the Center for Afro-American and African Studies, and a Certificate of Distinction for Outstanding Teaching.

Personal life
Lemuel Johnson married Marian Yankson, a Sierra Leonean in 1965 and the couple had two children, Yma Johnson and Yshelu Johnson.

Lemuel Johnson was fluent in several languages including Krio, the de facto national language of Sierra Leone, European languages such as Spanish, Portuguese, French, Italian, and German and African languages such as Yoruba, Hausa, and Igbo.

Death
Johnson died on 12 March 2002 after suffering from stomach cancer.

Published works
The Devil, the Gargoyle, & the Buffoon: The Negro as Metaphor in Western Literatures (1970) 
Sierra Leone Trilogy (1995)
Shakespeare in Africa & Other Venues: Import and the Appropriation of Culture (1998)

References
https://quod.lib.umich.edu/g/gefame/4761563.0001.101/--lemuel-a-johnson-1941-2002?rgn=main;view=fulltext
https://quod.lib.umich.edu/b/bhlead/umich-bhl-0574?view=text
https://quod.lib.umich.edu/b/bhlead/umich-bhl-0574?view=text#:~:text=While%20a%20student%20at%20Oberlin,%2C%201965%2C%20in%20Washington%2C%20D.C.
http://141.213.90.105/faculty/lemuel-johnson/memorial
https://lsa.umich.edu/daas/engagement/lemuel-johnson-center.html
https://quod.lib.umich.edu/g/gefame/4761563.0001.102/--aspects-of-african-diaspora-blood-letting-or-transfusion?rgn=main;view=fulltext

Sierra Leone Creole people
Sierra Leonean writers
Sierra Leonean male poets
Oberlin College alumni
Pennsylvania State University alumni
Academic staff of Fourah Bay College
University of Michigan alumni
University of Michigan faculty
1941 births
2002 deaths